Jim Woodward is an American politician. A Republican, he represents District 1 in the Idaho State Senate.

Early life 
Woodward was born and raised in Bonners Ferry. He attended and graduated from the University of Idaho. He is a United States Navy veteran.

Political career

Woodward was elected to represent District 1 in the Idaho State Senate in 2018, after the retirement of his predecessor Shawn Keough, who endorsed him. He sits on the Education and Finance committees.

Electoral record

References 

Living people
Republican Party Idaho state senators
University of Idaho alumni
Year of birth missing (living people)
21st-century American politicians